Majdan Królewski is a village in Kolbuszowa County, Subcarpathian Voivodeship, in south-eastern Poland. It is the seat of the gmina (administrative district) called Gmina Majdan Królewski.

The village has a population of 2,671.

Names

In 1900, those names were in use: MAYDAN BEI KOLBUSZOW (German) and MAYDAN KOLO KOLBUSCHOWA.

References

Villages in Kolbuszowa County